Richard Hiromana, sometimes spelled Richard Hirimana  (born 9 November 1996 or 30 November 1996) is a Solomon Islands footballer who plays as a defender for Real Kakamora. He made his debut for the national team on 25 May 2017, in a 1–1 draw against Fiji.

Club career
Hiromana started his career with Real Kakamora. After Marist had played in the 2017 OFC Champions League he joined the team. In 2018 Hiromana returned home to Real Kakamora.

International
Hiromana was named in the Solomon Islands national squad for the first time for two friendly's against Fiji. He made his debut in the first match on May 25, 2017, coming in as a substitute for Robert Laua in a 1–1 draw.

References

External links
 
 

Living people
1996 births
Association football defenders
Solomon Islands international footballers
Solomon Islands footballers
People from the Western Province (Solomon Islands)